The 2021 Tour de Hongrie was the 42nd edition of the Tour de Hongrie, which took place between 12 and 16 May 2021. It was the seventh edition since the race's revival in 2015, and was rated as a 2.1 event as part of the 2021 UCI Europe Tour.

Teams 
Eight UCI WorldTeams, nine UCI ProTeams, four UCI Continental teams, and the Hungarian national team made up the twenty-two teams that participated in the race. There were 130 riders who started the race, of which 117 finished.

UCI WorldTeams

 
 
 
 
 
 
 
 

UCI ProTeams

 
 
 
 
 
 
 
 
 

UCI Continental Teams

 
 
 
 

National Team

 Hungary

Route

Stages

Stage 1 
12 May 2021 — Siófok to Kaposvár,

Stage 2 
13 May 2021 — Balatonfüred to Nagykanizsa,

Stage 3 
14 May 2021 — Veszprém to Tata,

Stage 4 
15 May 2021 — Balassagyarmat to Gyöngyös (Kékestető),

Stage 5 
16 May 2021 — Budapest to Budapest,

Classification leadership table 

In the 2021 Tour de Hongrie, four jerseys are awarded. The general classification is calculated by adding each cyclist's finishing times on each stage. The leader of the general classification receives a yellow jersey, sponsored by the Hungarian Tourism Agency (Aktív Magyarország), and the winner of this classification is considered the winner of the race.

The second classification is the points classification. Riders are awarded points for finishing in the top fifteen of each stage. Points are also on offer at intermediate sprints. The leader of the points classification wears a green jersey, sponsored by Škoda and Europcar.

There is also a mountains classification for which points are awarded for reaching the top of a climb before other riders. The climbs are categorized, in order of increasing difficulty, as third, second, and first-category. The leader of the mountains classification wears a red jersey, sponsored by Cofidis.

The fourth jersey is a classification for Hungarian riders, marked by a white jersey sponsored by the Hungarian Public Road Company (Magyar Közút) and the Hungarian Cycling Federation (Bringasport). Only Hungarian riders are eligible and they are ranked according to their placement in the general classification of the race.

The final classification is the team classification, for which the times of the best three cyclists in each team on each stage are added together; the leading team at the end of the race is the team with the lowest cumulative time.

 On stage 2, Jakub Mareczko, who was second in the points classification, wore the green jersey, because first-placed Phil Bauhaus wore the yellow jersey as the leader of the general classification.
 On stage 3, Phil Bauhaus, who was second in the points classification, wore the green jersey, because first-placed Jordi Meeus wore the yellow jersey as the leader of the general classification.
 On stage 4, Jordi Meeus, who was second in the points classification, wore the green jersey, because first-placed Phil Bauhaus wore the yellow jersey as the leader of the general classification.

Final classification standings

General classification

Points classification

Mountains classification

Hungarian rider classification

Team classification

UCI point ranking

See also 

 2021 in men's road cycling
 2021 in sports

References

Sources

External links 

2021
Tour de Hongrie
Tour de Hongrie
Tour de Hongrie